Geoje Station is a station of the Busan Metro Line 3 and Donghae Line in Geoje-dong, Yeonje District, Busan, South Korea. The station is unrelated to the Geojehaemaji station of Korail. Nammungu station on Donghae Line became Geojehaemaji station on December 30, 2016.

Station Layout

Line 3

Donghae Line

Gallery

References

External links

  Cyber station information from Busan Transportation Corporation

Busan Metro stations
Yeonje District
Railway stations opened in 2005
Railway stations in Busan
Railway stations opened in 1989
1989 establishments in South Korea
20th-century architecture in South Korea